Little Red Walking Hood is a 1937 Merrie Melodies cartoon supervised by Fred Avery. The short was released on November 6, 1937, and features the first appearance of an early character who later became Elmer Fudd.

Plot
The cartoon features the basic plot of Little Red Riding Hood, with a few twists and oddball Tex Avery-like gags, such as Red displaying a Katharine Hepburn persona, or Grandma ordering a case of gin, while the wolf waits impatiently for her to get off the phone so he can chase her again.

The cartoon opens with the wolf playing on a vintage pinball machine. He notices Red walking by outside the window and drives after her along the sidewalk in his car. His advances fail and he decides to take a shortcut to her grandmother's house after being given the route by Elmer. As soon as the wolf arrives at grandma's house he knocks on the door and imitates an impression of Elmer Blurt from The Al Pearce Show. The grandma tells him to stay away but the wolf decides to burst through the door. This proves unsuccessful when he subsequently crashes through all the doors in the house and ends up in the backyard with his hat over his feet. He pulls the back doors knob and in a pinball reference, the door opens. He chases grandma around the house until she hops on a chair and crosses her fingers declaring King's X. She uses the phone to make a grocery order while the wolf waits impatiently for her to resume the chase. As the characters begin chasing each other again, grandma hides in the closet and the wolf asks her for her clothes as Red is at the door. The wolf hops into bed and asks Red to come closer. When Red exclaims, "Oh Grandmother, what large teeth you present" the wolf lunges at her and they start fighting in the corner of the room. Two silhouettes of patrons who are late to the screening show up and the wolf asks Red to wait for them to get seated. They resume fighting until Elmer shows up a sixth time and hits the wolf over the head with a mallet. As the "iris" comes back, Elmer is shown repeatedly kissing Red.

Voice cast
Elvia Allman as Little Red Walking Hood, Granny
Tedd Pierce as Wolf
Mel Blanc as Elmer

Home media
LaserDisc - The Golden Age of Looney Tunes, Volume 2, Side 7
DVD - Looney Tunes Golden Collection: Volume 5, Disc 2 (original opening, credits and closing titles restored)

Notes
According to David Gerstein (an animation historian), Eliza on her "Eliza’s Review Blog" for this cartoon, and Michael Barrier in his "Hollywood Cartoons: American Animation in Its Golden Age" book on his website, this is actually the first appearance of the early prototype of Elmer Fudd.
This cartoon was re-released into the Blue Ribbon Merrie Melodies program on August 17, 1946.

References

External links
 
 

Merrie Melodies short films
Warner Bros. Cartoons animated short films
American parody films
Fairy tale parody films
1937 animated films
1937 films
Films directed by Tex Avery
Films based on Little Red Riding Hood
Films scored by Carl Stalling
1930s Warner Bros. animated short films
Elmer Fudd films